Aquarama may refer to:

Riva Aquarama, a speedboat model built by Italian yachtbuilder Riva.
Aquarama Aquarium Theater of the Sea, an aquarium in South Philadelphia
SS Aquarama, a passenger ship that operated on the Great Lakes.
Aquarama Kristiansand, an indoor sports arena in Kristiansand, Norway.
Aquarama (water park), a water park in Benicàssim, Castelló, Spain
Aquarama microscope, a Leeuwenhoek microscope by John George Shield in the United Kingdom  1960